"I'll Be OK" is a song by English pop rock band McFly. It was released on 15 August 2005 as the second single from their second studio album, Wonderland (2005). The single became the group's fourth number-one single on the UK Singles Chart. Despite its initial popularity, it plunged to number eight during its second week on the chart and spent only a month inside the UK top 40.

Background

The song was written by band members Tom Fletcher, Dougie Poynter and Danny Jones. The single started its life out as two tracks, one written by Jones and the other by Fletcher and then by placing their "best" parts of their songs together, they had written I'll Be OK. In an interview, Tom Fletcher stated "It gives people a positive message, by saying that you should always reassure yourself, even when things do go wrong". The single also includes a new track—"No Worries"—written by former Busted members Charlie Simpson and James Bourne.

The opening of the song is similar to the opening "Won't Get Fooled Again" by the Who, who McFly were influenced by at the time. Another of The Who's songs, "Pinball Wizard", was also covered by McFly for an "I'll Be OK" B-side.

Music video
The music video features the band in various situations that are considered bad, sometimes following along with the lyrics. The video also shows the band on a rooftop playing their instruments. The video is said to have taken inspiration from the 2004 song "The Love of Richard Nixon" by Manic Street Preachers.

Track listings

UK CD1
 "I'll Be OK"
 "No Worries"

UK CD2
 "I'll Be OK"
 "Nothing"
 "Pinball Wizard"
 "I'll Be OK" (video)

UK DVD single
 "I'll Be OK" (audio)
 "All About You" (audio)
 "Pinball Wizard" (home video)
 "All About You" (video)
 "Home Footage"

Charts

Weekly charts

Year-end charts

References

2005 singles
McFly songs
Song recordings produced by Hugh Padgham
Songs written by Danny Jones
Songs written by Dougie Poynter
Songs written by Tom Fletcher
UK Singles Chart number-one singles